The barred sorubim (Pseudoplatystoma reticulatum) is a species of long-whiskered catfish native to the Río de la Plata basin and Amazon basin in South America.

References

Pimelodidae
Fish described in 1889